The 1899 Chicago Orphans season was the 28th season of the Chicago Orphans franchise, the 24th in the National League and the 7th at West Side Park. The Orphans finished eighth in the National League with a record of 75–73.

Regular season

Season standings

Record vs. opponents

Roster

Player stats

Batting

Starters by position 
Note: Pos = Position; G = Games played; AB = At bats; H = Hits; Avg. = Batting average; HR = Home runs; RBI = Runs batted in

Other batters 
Note: G = Games played; AB = At bats; H = Hits; Avg. = Batting average; HR = Home runs; RBI = Runs batted in

Pitching

Starting pitchers 
Note: G = Games pitched; IP = Innings pitched; W = Wins; L = Losses; ERA = Earned run average; SO = Strikeouts

References 
1899 Chicago Orphans season at Baseball Reference

Chicago Cubs seasons
Chicago Orphans season
Chicago Cubs